María Luciana Reynares (born 9 February 1976) is an Argentine former professional tennis player.

Reynares reached a best ranking of 156 in the world, while competing on the professional tour as a teenager in the early 1990s. She made her WTA Tour main draw debut at the 1990 Schenectady Open and won four ITF titles in 1991. Her biggest achievement then came in 1992 when she qualified for the 1992 French Open, where she was narrowly defeated in the first round by Finland's Petra Thorén, 6–8 in the third set.

ITF finals

Singles: 8 (4–4)

References

External links
 
 

1976 births
Living people
Argentine female tennis players
Sportspeople from Rosario, Santa Fe
20th-century Argentine women